Frœningen is a commune in the Haut-Rhin department in Alsace in north-eastern France.

History 
In 1312, Count Ulrich de Ferrette yielded Frœningen to Knight Conrad of Flaxlanden. The village was later ceded to Hadmansdorf in 1458, then to the noble family of Reinach-Heidwiller in 1539. During the Thirty Years' War, the castle was spared, but was finally set on fire by the Swiss in 1468. It was rebuilt in the eighteenth century, but was burned again, following the negligence of a cook, in 1739.

The castle was rebuilt in the early nineteenth century, but fell under the bombings of the First World War in 1917.

The village had a large Jewish community at the end of the nineteenth century and bore the nickname of Little Switzerland.

See also
 Communes of the Haut-Rhin département

References

Communes of Haut-Rhin